Buchałów  (formerly German Buchelsdorf) is a village in the administrative district of Gmina Świdnica, within Zielona Góra County, Lubusz Voivodeship, in western Poland.

References

Villages in Zielona Góra County